This is a list of categories of government bonds around the world.

Main issuers

Country by country data

Asia

Issued by: Ministry of Strategy and Finance
Korea Treasury Bond (KTB)
Korea International  Bond (KIB) 
National Housing Bond (NHB)
Ministry of Strategy and Finance

Issued By: Ministry of Finance (Zaimu-shō)
Japanese Government Bonds (JGBs)
Revenue Bonds/Straight Bonds
Financing Bills
Subsidy Bonds
Subscription Bonds
Contribution Bonds
Demand Bonds (kofu kokusai)
Index-linked Bonds (JGBi)
Ministry of Finance

Issued by: Hong Kong Monetary Authority
 Government Bond Programme 
Hong Kong Monetary Authority

Issued by: Ministry of Finance

 Ministry of Finance

Europe

Eurozone

Issued By: Österreichische Bundesfinanzierungsagentur, the Austrian Federal Financing Agency

Government Bonds
Debt Issuance Programme (DIP and DIP 144A)
Euro Medium Term Note (EMTN)
ATB-Programms

Österreichische Bundesfinanzierungsagentur

Issued By: Agentschap van de schuld/Agence de la Dette, the Belgian Debt Agency
Belgian Treasury Bills BTB - bills, tap-issued
Certificats de Trésorerie (CTs) - bills
Obligations linéaires ordinaires (OLOs) - bonds

Agentschap van de schuld/Agence de la Dette

Issued By: Valtiokonttori, the Finland State Treasury

Government Bonds
Yield Bonds
EMTN Programme
Government Treasury Bills

Valtiokonttori

Issued By: Agence France Trésor, the French Debt Agency
OATs
BTFs - bills of up to 1 year maturities
BTANs - 1 to 6 year notes
Obligations assimilables du Trésor (OATs) - 7 to 50 year bonds 
TEC10 OATs - floating rate bonds indexed on constant 10year maturity OAT yields
OATi - French inflation-indexed bonds
OAT€i - Eurozone inflation-indexed bonds

Agence France Trésor

Issued By: German Finance Agency, the German Debt Agency
Bunds
Unverzinsliche Schatzanweisungen (Bubills) - 6 and 12 month (zero coupon) Treasury discount paper
Bundesschatzanweisungen (Schätze) - 2 year Federal Treasury notes
Bundesobligationen (Bobls) - 5 year Federal notes 
inflationsindexierte Bundesobligationen (Bobl/ei) - 5 year inflation-linked Federal notes
Bundesanleihen (Bunds) - 10 and 30 year Federal bonds
inflationsindexierte Bundesanleihen (Bund/ei) - 10, 15 and 30 year inflation-linked Federal bonds

Federal Republic of Germany - Finance Agency

Issued By: Οργανισμός Διαχείρισης Δημοσίου Χρέους, the Public Debt Management Agency (PDMA).

Negotiable debt : Euro 354bn on 31 March 2011

Public Debt Management Agency

Issued By: Dipartimento del Tesoro
Buoni Ordinari del Tesoro (BOTs) - bills up to 1 year
Certificati del Tesoro Zero Coupon (CTZ) - bills up to 2 year
Buoni del Tesoro Poliannuali (BTPs) - bonds
Certificati di Credito del Tesoro (CCTs) - floating rate notes
BTP Indicizzato all'Inflazione - inflation linked bonds linked to Eurozone inflation
BTP Italia - inflation linked bonds linked to Italian Inflation 
Dipartimento del Tesoro

Issued by: Agentschap van het ministerie van Financiën, the Dutch State Treasury Agency
DTC (Dutch Treasury Certificates) - bills
DSL (Dutch State Loans) - bonds

Dutch State Treasury Agency

Issued By: Tesoro Público, the Spanish Public Treasury 
Letras del Tesoro - bills
Bonos del Estado - bonds 2–5 years
Obligaciones del Estado - bonds 5+ years

Tesoro Público

Non-Eurozone

Issued By: Ministry of Finance
 Policy Statement

Issued By: Danmarks Nationalbank, the Danish National Bank
Nominelle obligationer - bonds.
Inflationsindekserede obligationer - bonds, index-linked
Skatkammerbeviser - treasury bonds

Udstedelsespapirer

Issued By: UK Debt Management Office
Gilts
Conventional Gilts
Index-linked Gilts
Undated Gilts (The last of these were redeemed on 5 July 2015.)
Gilt Strips

UK Debt Management Office

Issued By: Lánasýsla ríkisins, the Icelandic National Debt Management Agency
 HFF bonds
 Housing bonds
 Housing authority bonds

Bond information in English
National Debt Management Agency

Issued By: Ministerul Finanțelor Publice, the Public Finance Ministry
Certificate de trezorerie - bills, maturity up to a year  
Obligațiuni de stat - bonds 
Bond information in English from the Ministry of Public Finance

Issued By: Riksgäldskontoret, the Swedish National Debt Office

Riksgäldskontoret

Americas

Caribbean

Issued by: COFINA, Puerto Rico Government Development Bank
 Puerto Rico Sales Tax Revenue Bonds

North America

Issued By: Bureau of the Fiscal Service
Treasury securities
Treasury bill
Treasury note
Treasury bond
TIPS
Savings bond

Bureau of the Fiscal Service

Issued By: 
 Canada Bond - fixed rate
 Real return bond (RRB) - inflation-indexed
 Canada Savings Bond (CSB)
 Ontario Savings Bond
 Saskatchewan Savings Bond

See also
Government bond
Government debt

References

External links
Economic and Financial Committee on EU Government Bills and Bonds
Rating by Dagong Global
Ratings by S&P
Ratings by Moody's

Lists by country

Finance lists